Hyacinthe is a given name.  It is generally a male name. The form Hyacinth may be masculine or feminine.

People with this name
 Hyacinthe (actor) (1814–1887), French actor and operetta singer
 Hyacinthe Besson (1816–1861), French painter and missionary priest
 Hyacinthe Collin de Vermont (1693–1761), French painter
 Hyacinthe de Bougainville (1781–1846), French naval officer
 Hyacinthe de Charencey (1832–1916), French philologist
 Hyacinthe de Valroger (1814–1876), French Roman Catholic priest
 Hyacinthe Decomberousse (1786–1856), French dramatist
 Hyacinthe Deleplace (born 1989), French Paralympian athlete
 Hyacinthe François Joseph Despinoy (1764–1848), General during the French Revolutionary Wars
 Hyacinthe Gaëtan de Lannion (1719–1762), French politician
 Hyacinthe Guevremont (1892–1964), Canadian ice hockey player
 Hyacinthe Henri Boncourt (died 1840), French chess player
 Hyacinthe Jadin (1776–1800), French composer
 Hyacinthe Klosé (1808–1880), French clarinet player
 Hyacinthe Libelli (1616–1684), Italian Archbishop of Avignon
 Hyacinthe Loyson (1827–1912), French Roman Catholic priest
 Hyacinthe Rigaud (1659–1743), French baroque painter
 Hyacinthe Robillard d'Avrigny (1675–1719), French Jesuit
 Hyacinthe Roosen (1897–?), Belgian wrestler
 Hyacinthe Serroni (1617–1687), French priest, bishop, diplomat and steward of the Navy
 Hyacinthe Serry, French Dominican Thomist theologian, controversialist and historian
 Hyacinthe Sigismond Gerdil (1718–1802), Italian theologian and cardinal
 Hyacinthe Thiandoum (1921–2004), Senegalese Archbishop of Dakar
 Hyacinthe Wodobodé (born 1953), Central African politician
 Hyacinthe-Louis de Quélen (1778–1839), Archbishop of Paris
 Hyacinthe-Marie Cormier (1832–1916), French Dominican friar and priest

Fiction 
 Hyacinthe, fictional character in Jacqueline Carey's Kushiel's Legacy series of novels

See also
 Kimberly Hyacinthe (born 1989), Canadian athlete
 Hyacinthe (disambiguation)
 Hyacinth (given name)

Masculine given names
French masculine given names